Police Story is a 30-minute American television anthology series that aired on CBS from April 4, 1952 to September 26, 1952. Twenty-four episodes were produced live in New York City. The scripts consisted of dramatic incidents drawn from actual police files from around the country, plus there were episodes about crime prevention. Actors included Edward Binns, E.G. Marshall, and James Gregory. The series was narrated by Norman Rose, who had also narrated the 1954 - 1955 season of The Big Story.

References

External links
Police Story at CVTA with episode list

1952 American television series debuts
1952 American television series endings
1950s American anthology television series
American live television series
Black-and-white American television shows
CBS original programming